Abrams is an unincorporated community census-designated place located in the town of Abrams, Oconto County, Wisconsin, United States. Abrams has a post office with ZIP code 54101. As of the 2020 census, its population was 358.

History
Abrams was first settled in 1854 when Richard B. Yeaton built a sawmill on the Pensaukee River. A community formed and he called the place West Pensaukee. It was renamed Abrams in the 1880s after W. J. Abrams, a former state representative and former mayor of Green Bay. Abrams owned land where a railroad depot was built.

Demographics

Notable people

C. J. Greaves, off-road racer
Johnny Greaves, off-road racer
Lyle Lahey, cartoonist
Pee Wee King, pioneer in the country and western music industry; wrote "Tennessee Waltz" and was inducted into the Country Music Hall of Fame in 1974
Bob Wickman, former relief pitcher for the New York Yankees, Milwaukee Brewers, Cleveland Indians, Atlanta Braves, and Arizona Diamondbacks
Arthur J. Whitcomb, Wisconsin State Representative and lawyer

References

External Links 

Census-designated places in Oconto County, Wisconsin
Census-designated places in Wisconsin